Pseudocellus pearsei is an arachnid species in the order Ricinulei. It occurs in caves in Yucatan, Mexico.

References 

 Chamberlin & Ivie, 1938 : Arachnida of the orders Pedipalpida, Scorpionida and Ricinulida. Fauna of the caves of Yucatan, Carnegie Institution of Washington Publication, n. 491, p. 101-107
 
 
  

Animals described in 1938
Ricinulei
Endemic spiders of Mexico
Cave arachnids
Fauna of the Yucatán Peninsula